= Warrant of restitution =

Court order

A Warrant of Restitution is a court order which empowers a property owner to use court bailiffs to enforce a possession order which was gained previously.

A common use of such a warrant is for a landlord to remove tenants which have re-entered the property after eviction. The warrant allows the bailiffs to remove all people found on the property. There is normally no requirement to start additional legal proceedings as it is effectively an additional warrant of possession.
